Jane de la Vaudère (15 April 1857 – 26 July 1908) was the pen name of Jeanne Scrive, a French novelist, poet and playwright.

Jane de la Vaudere was born on 15 April 1857 in Paris. Her father was a famous doctor, Gaspard-Léonard Scrive, Surgeon-General of the French Army during the Crimean War. She is considered by contemporary critics a participant in the Decadent movement and Naturalism.

Her poetic works include Les Heures perdues, L'Eternelle chanson, Minuit, and Evocation. She is also remembered for a collection of decadent novels and short stories, such as Les Androgynes (1903), Les Demi-Sexes (1897), or Les Sataniques (1897) — probably her masterpiece. She wrote exotic novels as well, including Les Courtisanes de Brahma, La Porte de Félicité or La Gueisha amoureuse.

She collaborated with the Théâtre du Grand Guignol. Vaudere died on 26 July 1908.

Bibliography

Novels and Short Stories

 Folie d'Opium
 Mortelle étreinte
 L'Anarchiste
 Le Droit d'aimer
 Ambitieuse
 Les Demi-Sexes
 Les Sataniques
 Le Sang
 Les Frôleurs
 L'Amuseur
 Trois fleurs de volupté
 Le Harem de Syta
 Les Mousseuses
 L'Amazone du roi de Siam
 La Mystérieuse
 Les Androgynes
 Les Courtisanes de Brahma
 L'Expulsée
 La Gesha amoureuse
 Les Confessions galantes
 Rien qu'amante
 La Sorcière d'Ecbatane
 La Porte de Félicité
 Sapho : dompteuse

External links
 Collection Jane de la Vaudère (biographie, bibliographie) at University of Toronto.

1857 births
1908 deaths
French women writers
Decadent literature
French fantasy writers
Women science fiction and fantasy writers
Women horror writers
19th-century women writers